Wahlenbergia gracilenta, commonly known as annual bluebell, is a small herbaceous plant in the family Campanulaceae native to Western Australia.

It blooms between May and December producing white-blue flowers.

The species is found on hillsides, amongst granite outcrops and in damp depressions in the Mid West, Wheatbelt, South West, Great Southern and Goldfields-Esperance regions of Western Australia where it grows in sandy-loamy-clay soils.

References

gracilenta
Eudicots of Western Australia
Plants described in 1947
Endemic flora of Western Australia